The Pegasus PAL 95 is a twin cylinder, horizontally opposed aircraft engine that was developed by Pegasus Aviation (NZ) Ltd of New Zealand for use in ultralight aircraft. The engine is no longer available.

Development
Designed to fill a similar market segment as the similar configuration and output HKS 700E, the PAL 95 produces  at 5200 rpm.

The PAL 95 has a computer-controlled engine management system that controls both the fuel injection system and the ignition timing, giving automatic altitude-compensated mixture control. The pistons are forged and ceramic coated. The intake valves are made from nickel-steel and the exhaust valves from stainless steel. The engine was supplied with an electric starter and an exhaust system by the factory as standard equipment.

Speed reduction is via a standard twin cog-belt system, with harmonic dampening on the crankshaft pulley. The initial TBO was estimated by the manufacturer as 1500 hours.

Specifications (PAL 95)

See also

References

1990s aircraft piston engines